The Margraviate of Austria was a medieval frontier march, centered along the river Danube, between the river Enns and the Vienna Woods (Wienerwald), within the territory of modern Austrian provinces of Upper Austria and Lower Austria. It existed from c. 972 to 1156.

It stemmed from the previous frontier structures, initially created for the defense of eastern Bavarian borders against the Avars, who were defeated and conquered during the reign of Charlemagne (d. 814). Throughout the Frankish period, the region was under jurisdiction of Eastern Frankish rulers, who held Bavaria and appointed frontier commanders (counts) in eastern regions.

At the beginning of the 10th century, the region was raided by Magyars. They were defeated in the Battle of Lechfeld (955) and gradual German reconquest of the region began. By 972, newly retaken frontier regions along the river Danube were reorganized into a frontier county (margraviate) that became known as the Bavarian Eastern March or Ostarrichi. The first known margrave was Burkhard, who is mentioned in sources since 972. 

Since 976, it was governed by margraves from the Franconian noble House of Babenberg. The margraviate was protecting the eastern borders of the Holy Roman Empire, towards neighbouring Hungary. It became an Imperial State in its own right, when the Austrian margraves were elevated to Dukes of Austria in 1156.

Name

The Bavarian designation is used in historiography in order to differentiate it from the Saxon Eastern March in the northeast.

Geography
The march comprised the lands north and south of the Danube river, with the  tributary in the west forming the border with the  shire of the Bavarian stem duchy. The eastern frontier with the Hungarian settlement area in the Pannonian Basin ran along the Morava (March) and Leitha rivers, with the  borderland (the present-day  region) beyond. In the north, the march bordered on the Bohemian duchy of the Přemyslids, and the lands in the south belonged to the Dukes of Carinthia, also newly instated in 976. The early march corresponded closely to the modern region of Lower Austria.

Under Margrave Ernest the Brave (1055–1075), the colonisation of the northern  up to the Thaya river and the Bohemian march of Moravia was begun, and the Hungarian March was merged into Austria. The margraves' residence later was moved down the Danube to  until 1145, when Vienna became the official capital. The Babenbergs had a defense system of several castles built in the Wienerwald mountain range and along the Danube river, among them .

The early margraviate was populated by a mix of Slavic and native Romano-Germanic peoples who were apparently speaking Rhaeto-Romance languages, remnants of which remain today in parts of northern Italy (Friulian and Ladin) and in Switzerland (Romansh). In the Austrian Alps some valleys retained their Rhaeto-Romance speakers until the 17th century.

History

Background

Both were established in the late 8th century by Charlemagne upon the incorporation of the territory of the Agilolfing dukes of Bavaria against the invasions of the Avars. When the Avars disappeared in the 820s, they were replaced largely by West Slavs, who settled here within the state of Great Moravia. The March of Pannonia was set apart from the Duchy of Friuli in 828 and set up as a march against Moravia within the East Frankish  of Bavaria. By the 890s, the Pannonian march seems to have disappeared, along with the threat from Great Moravia, during the Hungarian invasions of Europe. Upon the defeat of Margrave Luitpold of Bavaria at the 907 Battle of Pressburg, all East Frankish lands beyond the Enns river were lost.

Margraviate
In 955, King Otto I of Germany had started the reconquest with his victory at the 955 Battle of Lechfeld. The obscurity of the period from circa 900 until 976 leads some to posit that a Pannonian or Austrian march existed against the Magyars, alongside the other marches which had been incorporated into Bavaria by 952 (Carniola, Carinthia, Istria, and Verona). However, much of Pannonia was still conquered by the Magyars. Otto I had a new Eastern March erected and by 972, he appointed Burchard as margrave. In 976, during a general restructuring of Bavaria upon the insurrection of Duke Henry II the Wrangler, Otto's son and successor Emperor Otto II deposed Burchard and appointed the Babenberg count Leopold the Illustrious from the House of Babenberg margrave in turn for his support. 

Margravial Austria reached its greatest height under Leopold III, a great friend of the church and founder of abbeys. He patronised towns and developed a great level of territorial independence. In 1139, Leopold IV inherited Bavaria. From 1192 the House of Babenberg also ruled over the neighbouring Duchy of Styria. The line became extinct with the death of Duke Frederick II of Austria at the 1246 Battle of the Leitha River. The heritage was finally asserted by the German king Rudolph of Habsburg against King Ottokar II of Bohemia in the 1278 Battle on the Marchfeld.

See also
 History of Austria
 Pannonian March
 Avarian March
 Hungarian March

Notes

References

 
 
 
 
 
 

 
970s establishments in the Holy Roman Empire
12th-century disestablishments in the Holy Roman Empire
States and territories established in the 970s
States and territories disestablished in the 1150s
970s establishments
1156 disestablishments
Former monarchies of Europe

DE:Ostarrichi